David Spinozza is an American guitarist and producer. He worked with former Beatles Paul McCartney, Ringo Starr and John Lennon during the 1970s, and had a long collaboration with singer-songwriter James Taylor, producing Taylor's album Walking Man.

Career
Spinozza worked with McCartney during sessions for McCartney's Ram album during 1971. When the chance came to work with Lennon two years later, as Yoko Ono prepared her Feeling the Space album and Lennon his Mind Games, Spinozza discovered that Lennon was not aware he had previously worked with McCartney, and was afraid he would be fired if Lennon found out, given their recent feuding in the media. When Lennon did learn of it, his only comment was that McCartney "knows how to pick good people." Exact same story is related about Hugh McCracken.
 
David sessioned on Tim Weisberg's 1972 Hurtwood Edge and Cashman & West's 1974 Lifesong. Spinozza contributed to Ono's album A Story, recorded during 1974 (but not released until 1998), served as her bandleader during a residency at Kenny's Castaways, and rehearsed Ono's band to tour her native Japan, but parted ways with her when the tour began. After no communication for several years, Ono contacted Spinozza late in 1980, for his permission to release "It Happened", a track from A Story, as a B-side to "Walking on Thin Ice", her tribute to the recently assassinated John Lennon and the last song they had recorded together. Spinozza gave his permission. The track appeared with a new coda, recorded by Lennon and Ono's band from Double Fantasy.

Spinozza also appeared on Ringo Starr's 1977 album Ringo the 4th, earning him the distinction of having recorded with three of the four Beatles.

Spinozza played acoustic guitar on the song "Honesty" on the 1978 Billy Joel album 52nd Street.

In 1978 he released Spinozza on the A&M label, a jazz-oriented album with some vocal tracks.

Spinozza played the guitar solo on Dr. John's hit, "Right Place, Wrong Time", played on Paul Simon's albums Paul Simon and There Goes Rhymin' Simon, Don McLean's American Pie, and later made contributions to the soundtracks of the movies Dead Man Walking, Happiness, and Just the Ticket. The first album David produced in its entirety was the folk rock trio Arthur, Hurley & Gottlieb who were signed by Clive Davis during his ten years as president Columbia Records. Spinozza was a member of the Saturday Night Live band from 1980 to 1982. He also conducted the band in 1980 and 1981.

He held the first guitar chair in the Broadway orchestra of Hairspray and, in 2009, reunited with his band from 1973, "L'Image" which also includes Mike Mainieri, Warren Bernhardt, Tony Levin and Steve Gadd.

Selected Discography

With B.B. King
 B.B. King in London (1971)
With Rusty Bryant
 Until It's Time for You to Go (1974)
With Paul Simon
 Paul Simon (1972)
With Richard Davis
 Dealin' (1973)
With Roberta Flack and Donny Hathaway
 Roberta Flack & Donny Hathaway (1972)
With John Denver
 Whose Garden Was This (1970)
With Michael Franks
 One Bad Habit (1980)
 Time Together (2011)
 The Music in My Head (2018)
With Art Farmer
 Yama with Joe Henderson (1979)
With Johnny Hodges
 3 Shades of Blue (1970)
With Ron Davies
 U.F.O. (1973)
With Richie Havens
 Connections (1980)
With Patricia Kaas
 Dans ma chair (1997)
With Judy Collins
 Judith (1975)
With Ringo Starr
 Ringo the 4th (1977)
With Paul McCartney
 Ram (1971)
With Stephen Bishop
 Red Cab to Manhattan (1980)
With Jim Croce
 Life and Times (1973)
With Rod Stewart
 As Time Goes By: The Great American Songbook, Volume II (2003)
With Charlie Mariano
 Mirror (1972)
With Bert Sommer
 Bert Sommer (1970)
 Bert Sommer (1977)
With Bette Midler
 The Divine Miss M (1972)
 Bette Midler (1973)
 Songs for the New Depression (1976)
 Thighs and Whispers (1979)
With Garland Jeffreys
 Ghost Writer (1977)
 One-Eyed Jack (1978)
With Laura Branigan
 Over My Heart (1993)
With David Pomeranz
Time to Fly (1971)
With Melissa Manchester
 Singin'... (1977)
 Hey Ricky (1982)
With Labelle
 Labelle (1971)
 Moon Shadow (1972)
With Margie Joseph
 Margie Joseph (1973)
 Sweet Surrender (1974)
With Don McLean
 American Pie (1971)
 Homeless Brother (1974)
With Dionne Warwick
 Dionne Warwick Sings Cole Porter (1990)
With Robin Kenyatta 
 Gypsy Man (1973)
With Stephanie Mills
 Stephanie (1981)
With Yusef Lateef
 Hush 'N' Thunder (1972)
With Céline Dion
 Let's Talk About Love (1997)
With Marc Cohn
 Marc Cohn (1991)
With Roberta Flack
 Feel Like Makin' Love (1975)
 Blue Lights in the Basement (1977)
 Roberta Flack (1978)
With Carla Thomas
 Memphis Queen (1969)
With Carly Simon
 Spy (1979)
 Torch (1981)
With Merry Clayton
 Keep Your Eye on the Sparrow (1975)
With Yoko Ono
 Feeling the Space (1973)
 A Story (1997)
With David Batteau
 Happy in Hollywood (1976)
With Aretha Franklin
 Let Me in Your Life (1974)
With The Manhattan Transfer
 Tonin' (1995)
With Jennifer Holliday
 Say You Love Me (1985)
 Get Close to My Love (1987)
With Johnny Lytle
 The Soulful Rebel (1971)
With The Thad Jones/Mel Lewis Orchestra
 Consummation (1970)
With Peter Allen
 Continental American (1974)
 I Could Have Been a Sailor (1979)
With George Benson
 In Your Eyes (1983)
With Frankie Valli
 Lady Put the Light Out (1977)
With Kate & Anna McGarrigle
 Kate & Anna McGarrigle (1976)
 Pronto Monto (1978)
 Entre la jeunesse et la sagesse (1980)
With James Taylor
 Walking Man (1974)
With Elvis Costello
 Painted from Memory (1998)
With John Lennon
 Mind Games (1973)
With Barry Manilow
 This One's for You (1976)
With Yvonne Elliman
 Yvonne Elliman (1972)
With Herbie Mann
 Push Push (1971)
 Turtle Bay (1973)
With Jean-Pierre Ferland 
 Jaune (1970)
 Soleil (1971) 
With Bonnie Raitt
 Streetlights (1974)
With Arif Mardin
 Journey (1974)
With Les McCann
 Invitation to Openness (1972)
With David Newman
 The Weapon (1973)
With Shirley Scott
 Superstition (1973)
With Joe Thomas
 Joy of Cookin' (1972)
With Charles Williams
 Stickball (1972)
With Deodato
 Very Together (1976)
With Billy Joel
 52nd Street (1978)
With David Sanborn
 Heart to Heart (1978)
With Michael Kenny
 guitar on some tracks on self-titled Michael Kenny album (Tom Cat/RCA, 1976)

Notes and references

Bibliography
 Pang, May. Loving John (Warner Books, 1982), 
 The Editors of Rolling Stone. The Ballad of John and Yoko  (Rolling Stone Press, 1982), 
 Seaman, Frederic. The Last Days of John Lennon'' (Warner Books, 1991),

External links

Year of birth missing (living people)
American rock guitarists
American male guitarists
American people of Italian descent
Living people
Plastic Ono Band members
Guitarists from New York City
Record producers from New York (state)
Songwriters from New York (state)
American session musicians
A&M Records artists
Saturday Night Live Band members
White Elephant Orchestra members